In 1980, the Hebrew Academy Las Vegas opened at the original Temple Beth Sholom in East Las Vegas. Eight years later, its Director, Dr. Tamar Lubin Saposhnik along with Las Vegas businessman Milton I. Schwartz and others, created the Milton I. Schwartz Hebrew Academy for elementary-aged children.

Dr. Miriam and Sheldon G. Adelson made a major gift in November 2006, for The Adelson School in Summerlin, which grew from 145 students to 500 students today.

The Adelson Educational Campus consists of three schools:

• The Lower School provides students from 18 months through 4th grade.

• The Middle School, grades 5–8.

• The Upper School, grades 9–12.

References

External links
 The Adelson Educational Campus

Jews and Judaism in Nevada
Schools in Las Vegas
Private high schools in Nevada
Private middle schools in Nevada
Private elementary schools in Nevada
Summerlin, Nevada
Jewish day schools in the United States